András Németh (born 9 November 2002) is a footballer who plays as a forward for German  club Hamburger SV. Born in South Africa, he represents the Hungary national team.

Club career
On 27 January 2023, Németh signed a 3.5-year contract with Hamburger SV in Germany.

International career
Németh was born in South Africa to a Hungarian father and South African mother. He is a youth international for Hungary.

He was part of the Hungarian U17 national team at the 2019 UEFA European Under-17 Championship and 2019 FIFA U-17 World Cup,

He debuted in the Hungary senior national team against Luxembourg on 17 November 2022. He also scored his first goal on his debut at the Stade de Luxembourg in Luxembourg City. He said in the interview right after the end of the match that: "It is a big happiness and honour for me to represent Hungary". However, he suffered a knee injury after the match so he had to leave the national team the following day and could not play against Greece in Budapest.

Career statistics

Club

International

Scores and results list Hungary's goal tally first, score column indicates score after each Németh goal.

References

Living people
2002 births
Cape Coloureds
Hungarian people of South African descent
South African people of Hungarian descent
Hungarian footballers
South African soccer players
Soccer players from Cape Town
Association football forwards
Hungary international footballers
Hungary under-21 international footballers
Hungary youth international footballers
K.R.C. Genk players
Lommel S.K. players
Hamburger SV players
Belgian Pro League players
Challenger Pro League players
Hungarian expatriate footballers
Hungarian expatriate sportspeople in Belgium
South African expatriate sportspeople in Belgium
Expatriate footballers in Belgium
Hungarian expatriate sportspeople in Germany
South African expatriate sportspeople in Germany
Expatriate footballers in Germany